Bogote is a town in the Sidéradougou Department of Comoé Province in south-western Burkina Faso. The town has a population of 1,887.

References

Populated places in the Cascades Region
Comoé Province